Victor Carton Patrick Costello (born 23 October 1970) is a retired Irish rugby union player and Olympic shot-putter.

Athletics career
Costello is a former five-time Irish shot put champion; he finished in 22nd place at the 1992 Summer Olympics in Barcelona.

Rugby career
Playing senior rugby throughout the 1990s until his retirement in 2005, Costello's rugby career with Leinster and Ireland straddled the amateur and professional eras. He was part of the Irish team at the 2003 Rugby World Cup, and also had spells with Connacht and London Irish.

Irish Rugby player file
Official Leinster caps: 126
Points scored: 80 (16 tries)
Celtic League/Cup caps: 38 (5 tries)
Heineken Cup caps: 57 (5 tries)
Senior debut: Friendly, 46–11 win v Natal XV at Anglesea Road, 25 October 1995
Heineken Cup debut: 24–21 win v Milan in Italy, 1 November 1995
Ireland caps: 39 (January 1996 – 2004)
Ireland points: 20 (4 tries)
Ireland "A" caps: 9
Ireland Under-21 caps: 2
Ireland Schools caps: 4
Leinster Under-20/21 caps: 1

Other work and family
Costello provides TV and radio analysis for RTÉ Sport on field events in major athletics championships, including the 2012 London Olympics. He also works as a pilot for Ryan Air, and is a committee member of the rugby sevens club, Shamrock Warriors. His sister Suzanne is an Irish international hockey player, sprinter and director of the Samaritans (Charity). His father Paddy ('Butch') was also a shot putter and Irish International rugby player, playing second row.

References

External links
Victor Costello Sporting Heroes
Victor Costello IrishRugby.ie

Living people
1970 births
Ireland international rugby union players
Leinster Rugby players
London Irish players
Connacht Rugby players
Irish rugby union players
St Mary's College RFC players
Blackrock College RFC players
Irish male shot putters
Athletes (track and field) at the 1992 Summer Olympics
Olympic athletes of Ireland
Rugby union flankers
Rugby union number eights
People educated at Blackrock College